Thetford is a civil parish in the ward of Stretham, near Ely, in the East Cambridgeshire district, in the county of Cambridgeshire, England. The village of Little Thetford is coterminous with the parish. In the 2001 census, the parish had a population of 639.

References 

Civil parishes in Cambridgeshire
East Cambridgeshire District